Robert M. Mitten (August 9, 1928 – April 21, 1972) was an American football player and coach. He served as the head football coach at West Chester University of Pennsylvania from 1965 to 1971. Mitten played college football at the University of North Carolina–Chapel Hill from 1945 to 1948. He was selected by the Chicago Bears in the 1949 NFL Draft.

References

External links
 

1928 births
1972 deaths
American football guards
North Carolina Tar Heels football players
West Chester Golden Rams football coaches
High school football coaches in North Carolina
People from Shippensburg, Pennsylvania